Yasin Abbas Ayari (born 6 October 2003) is a Swedish professional footballer who plays as a midfielder for Premier League club Brighton & Hove Albion.

Club career 
Ayari began playing football with the youth academy of Råsunda at the age of 6, before moving to AIK around the age of 8.

AIK 
Ayari made his professional debut with AIK in a 2–2 Allsvenskan tie with Elfsborg on 6 December 2020. On 22 October 2021, he signed his first professional contract with AIK until 31 December 2025.

Brighton and Hove Albion 
On 30 January 2023, Ayari signed a contract with Brighton until June 2027. He made his Albion debut on 19 March, coming on as a 78th minute substitute replacing Alexis Mac Allister in the 5–0 FA Cup quarter-final win over League Two side Grimsby Town. He attempted a bicycle kick in which he couldn't quite make connection in what would've been his first touch of the ball in a Brighton shirt.

International career
Born in Sweden to parents from Tunisia and Morocco, Ayari is a youth international for Sweden. Ayari made his full international debut for Sweden in a friendly game against Finland on 10 January 2023.

Personal life
His brother Taha, born 2005, currently plays for AIK and has had a trial at Feyenoord.

Career statistics

References

External links
 
 Svensk Fotbool Profile

2003 births
Living people
People from Solna Municipality
Swedish footballers
Sweden international footballers
Sweden youth international footballers
Swedish people of Tunisian descent
Swedish people of Moroccan descent
Association football midfielders
AIK Fotboll players
Brighton & Hove Albion F.C. players
Allsvenskan players
Sportspeople from Stockholm County